Big Fish Theory is the second studio album by American rapper Vince Staples. It was released on June 23, 2017, through Blacksmith Records and Def Jam Recordings. Featuring an avant-garde style that leans toward electronic club music genres such as house and Detroit techno, it contains production work from Christian Rich, Zack Sekoff, Sophie, Ray Brady, Jimmy Edgar, GTA, Justin Vernon and Flume, among others; as well as vocal contributions from a variety of artists including Kilo Kish, Kendrick Lamar, Juicy J, Ty Dolla Sign, Damon Albarn, Ray J, ASAP Rocky and Kučka.

Staples promoted Big Fish Theory with a tour through Canada and the United States, the Life Aquatic Tour. The album received widespread acclaim from critics, and debuted at number 16 on the US Billboard 200. It was supported by three singles: "BagBak", "Big Fish" and "Rain Come Down".

Recording and production
The majority of Big Fish Theory was recorded at EastWest Studios in Los Angeles, except for "Ramona Park Is Yankee Stadium" and "BagBak", which were recorded with producer Ray Brady at The Torch, also in Los Angeles. Staples met Zack Sekoff, the album's primary producer, through Staples' DJ Westside Ty.

Music and lyrics

Style and influences
Big Fish Theorys sound was inspired by Detroit techno. Los Angeles producer Zack Sekoff, who has production credit on five of the songs on the album, sourced inspiration when on a semester abroad in London from artists such as Burial, James Blake, Novelist, Wiley and Zomby.

Composition and lyrics
Big Fish Theory is a hip hop album, with several publications noting that the album leans toward electronic club music genres such as house and Detroit techno. The album contains "terse and percussive" beats. Rolling Stone characterized the album as an "avant-garde dance record that takes stock of his current loves, victories, politics and – most noticeably – interest in the cutting edge of electronic music". Similarly, Justin Moran of Out said the album "fuses avant-garde electronica with aggressive hip-hop" and HipHopDX described it as "one of the more avant-garde projects backed by Def Jam". "Crabs in a Bucket" has wind, a police siren, ambient tape hiss, vocal chops and synthesizers. "Party People" has "stuttering" and syncopated tom-toms.

Big Fish Theorys lyrics are nihilistic and touch on politics, suicide, racism and success and fame. NME said: "[Staples'] bleak lyrical brilliance is perfectly matched by Big Fish Theorys experimental production. He's always had a taste for harsh electronic funk, and he embraces that creative urge more eagerly than ever. There's slo-mo techno, dystopian G-funk, field recordings, growling industrialism; abstract, icy grooves more indebted to Berlin than Atlanta." AllMusic described the record as "a skittish thought piece wrapped around the nucleus of the Chicago footwork sound". Brian Josephs of Spin thought that "Big Fish Theorys whiplash sonic shifts and industrial makeup will make comparisons with Kanye West's Yeezus easy. However, it may have more in common with The Life of Pablo, which combined elements of Yeezus avant-garde structure with My Beautiful Dark Twisted Fantasys tortured look at fame".

Release and promotion
On November 29, 2016, Staples announced he would go on a 2017 tour in promotion of Big Fish Theory, the Life Aquatic Tour, alongside Kilo Kish. It began on February 24, 2017, in San Diego, California, and ended on April 9 of the same year, in Phoenix, Arizona.

On January 3, 2017, Staples announced that he would release a song called "BagBak" on February 2, 2017. On May 18, in an interview on Zane Lowe's show Beats 1, he announced the title of his upcoming album and released an accompanying single, "Big Fish". He also announced that Big Fish Theory would be released on June 23, 2017. On June 8, he released his third single, "Rain Come Down", as well an accompanying music video. On June 11, he released the album's artwork and an Instagram photo of the 12-song track list. Billboards Tatiana Cirisano listed the "clever" artwork, which depicts a "frightened-looking guppy", as one of the best of 2017.

Critical reception

Big Fish Theory was met with widespread critical acclaim. At Metacritic, which assigns a normalized rating out of 100 to reviews from mainstream publications, the album received an average score of 89, based on 25 reviews. Aggregator AnyDecentMusic? gave it 8.4 out of 10, based on their assessment of the critical consensus.

AllMusic critic Neil Z. Yeung thought that "Big Fish Theory cements Staples' status as one of the most talented and forward-thinking voices in rap in the late 2010s". The A.V. Clubs Clayton Purdom stated: "On Big Fish Theory, an album about the guilt that comes with transcending one's home, Staples finds a better language still." Liam Egan of Clash described the album as "a record that not only sees Vince taking risks and progressing forward as an artist, but also another astounding example of what hip-hop should and can be in 2017". Eric Renner Brown of Entertainment Weekly thought that Big Fish Theory "surpasses expectations, with incisive lyrics and beats that spurn current trends for a set that sounds unlike anything else in hip-hop right now". The Guardians Kate Hutchinson stated that the record "makes for a challenging, dystopian listen, the blade runner to everyone else's replicant".

Joe Madden of NME stated that Staples' lyrics are "emotionally calibrated for 2017: antsy, alienated and occasionally overcome with nihilistic despair at the state of the world. And his bleak lyrical brilliance is perfectly matched by Big Fish Theorys experimental production". Pitchfork gave it the title of "Best New Music" with writer Sheldon Pearce stating that "Big Fish Theory feels like a natural progression" and further added: "Amid the gleaming productions, he's still exploring darkness." Rolling Stones Christopher R. Weingarten stated: "sure, it's less focused than the reportage of 2015's Summertime '06, but the varying emotions and outlooks mark a full step forward into becoming a multi-layered, genre-crossing, emotion-spilling pop auteur in the vein of West, Drake or Childish Gambino." The Line of Best Fits Erik Thompson wrote that "on this record it is clear that Staples is making his own assertive artistic statement for these turbulent times, while also firmly establishing himself as one of the brash, singular voices that is going to be leading the music world into the chaotic, unpredictable future". Sputnikmusic praised the album, calling it the best hip hop album of 2017.

Year-end lists

Commercial performance
Big Fish Theory debuted at number 16 on the US Billboard 200 with 24,000 album-equivalent units, of which 14,000 were pure album sales.

Track listing

Notes
  signifies a co-producer
  signifies an additional producer

Sample credits
 "Alyssa Interlude" contains samples of "I Wish It Would Rain", written by Rodger Penzabene, Barrett Strong and Norman Whitfield, and performed by The Temptations; and excerpts from Tim Chipping's interview with Amy Winehouse.
 "Love Can Be..." contains an interpolation of "Hood Nigga (Remix)", written by Alonzo Mathis, Dana Ramey and Christopher Ussery, and performed by Gorilla Zoe.
 "Homage" contains an interpolation of "Hold Me Back", written by Joshua Murphy, Julius Preston and William Roberts, and performed by Rick Ross.

Personnel
Credits adapted from the album's official liner notes.

Musicians
 Kilo Kish – additional vocals 
 Juicy J – additional vocals 
 Damon Albarn – additional vocals , keyboard 
 Ray J – additional vocals 
 Kendrick Lamar – additional vocals 
 Kučka – additional vocals 
 ASAP Rocky – additional vocals 
 Ken Rogers – additional vocals 
 Ty Dolla Sign – additional vocals 
 Zack Sekoff – programming , electric guitar , keyboards , synth bass , synthesizer 
 Christian Rich – programming 
 Jimmy Edgar – programming 
 Justin Vernon – additional programming 
 Taylor Mackall – additional keyboards 

Production
 Zack Sekoff – production 
 Christian Rich – production 
 GTA – production 
 Jimmy Edgar – production 
 Ray Brady – production , recording 
 Sophie – production 
 Justin Vernon – co-production 
 Flume – additional production 
 Michael Law Thomas – recording , vocal recording 
 William Francis Delaney VI – additional engineering 
 Chaz R. Sexton – assistant engineering 
 Mark "Spike" Stent – mixing 
 Michael Freeman – mixing assistance 
 Chris Gehringer – mastering

Design
 Alexander Bortz – photography

Charts

References

External links
 

2017 albums
Albums produced by Flume (musician)
Albums produced by Justin Vernon
Def Jam Recordings albums
Electronic albums by American artists
Vince Staples albums
Albums produced by Sophie (musician)